The Columbia River Shipbuilding Company was a small shipyard in Portland, Oregon, United States, located on the west bank of the Willamette River. The shipyard was located at the foot of SW Sheridan Street, just upstream of the Interstate 5 Marquam Bridge, directly adjacent to the Northwest Steel shipyard.

The owners of Columbia River Shipbuilding were A. F. Smith and J. Frank Watson, who were also owners of the Smith and Watson Iron Works. The shipyard was managed by Charles D. Bowles, who was also associated with J. F. Duthie Shipbuilding of Seattle, Washington. Columbia River Shipbuilding was established in 1918 to build cargo ships for the United States Shipping Board (USSB). The shipyard closed shortly after the end of World War I.

Most of the 32 ships built by the Columbia River Shipbuilding Company were the West boats, a series of  steel-hulled cargo ships built for the USSB on the West Coast of the United States as part of the World War I war effort. The first ship built at Columbia River Shipbuilding was the cargo ship ; the final ship completed was the cargo ship West Hassayampa, completed in January 1920.

Notable ships built by Columbia River Shipbuilding

References

Shipbuilding companies of Oregon
Defunct shipbuilding companies of the United States
Companies based in Portland, Oregon
Defunct companies based in Oregon
Manufacturing companies established in 1918
Manufacturing companies disestablished in 1920
1918 establishments in Oregon
1920 disestablishments in Oregon
History of transportation in Oregon